The Otto A.G.O. 50 hp aircraft engine from 1911 was a four-cylinder, water cooled inline engine built by the German Gustav Otto Flugmaschinenwerke.

Design and development

The Otto A.G.O. (Aeromotor Gustav Otto) 50 hp engine was designed by Hans Geisenhof in 1911 at the Gustav Otto Flugmaschinenwerke.

The cylinders were cast separately from iron and then machined. They were grouped together to a single block, joined at their cooling jackets by means of flanges and bolts. There were two side valves per cylinder, which were operated from the camshaft, which was located on the left side of the engine block and driven from the crankshaft by spur gears.
All four cylinders were fed by a single carburettor. A single spark plug per cylinder was mounted above the inlet valve, with the magneto located at the control side of the engine, driven from the crankshaft via an intermediate spur gear.

The crankshaft was supported by one intermediate and two outer plain bearings, with two additional thrust ball bearings at the propeller end. Lubrication was pressure fed, with an oil pump feeding oil to the crankshaft bearings.

Applications

Otto Renn-Doppeldecker (1912) racing biplane

Specifications

See also

References

Citations

Works cited

Further reading

External links

1910s aircraft piston engines
Otto aircraft engines